Scott Glacier is a 15-mile-long (24 km) glacier located in the Chugach Mountains, near Cordova, Alaska. The Scott Glacier was named in 1908 after a "local miner".

See also

 List of glaciers

References

Glaciers of Alaska
Glaciers of Chugach Census Area, Alaska
Glaciers of Unorganized Borough, Alaska